Karibib constituency is a constituency in the Erongo Region of Namibia. It had a population of 13,320 in 2011, an increase from 12,084 in 2001. The district capital is the town of Karibib.  the constituency had 9,617 registered voters.

Politics
In the 2010 regional elections, SWAPO's Ussiel Poulus Xoagub narrowly won the constituency with 1,498 votes. He defeated challenger Zedekias Tsamaseb of the United Democratic Front (UDF, 1,313 votes) and Manfriedt Weskop of the Rally for Democracy and Progress (RDP, 458 votes).

The 2015 regional elections were won by Melania Ndjago of SWAPO with 1,902 votes. Tsamaseb of UDF came second with 1,212 votes while Christiaan Nguherimo of the RDP received 217 votes. Ndjago was narrowly reelected in the 2020 regional election, winning the constituency with 1,296 votes. UDF was again runner-up, its candidate Ernestus Axakhoeb received 1,172 votes. In third place was Rudolf Kahingunga from the Independent Patriots for Change (IPC, an opposition party formed in August 2020). He obtained 529 votes.

References

Constituencies of Erongo Region
States and territories established in 1992
1992 establishments in Namibia

es:Distrito electoral de Karibib